Clown & Sunset was an independent record label founded by Nicolas Jaar in 2009. It was part of Clown & Sunset Aesthetics, an interdisciplinary production house founded by Jaar and film producer Noah Kraft. The label was shut down in August 2013 after which Jaar founded his imprint Other People.

History

Nikita Quasim, Soul Keita and Nicolas Jaar met in the summer of 2004 while traveling with their respective schools on a field trip to the Sonora desert. Although they were uninterested in each other at first, they quickly bonded over their mutual interest in music. In January 2009, on his nineteenth birthday, Jaar decided to formalize his endeavors with Quasim and Keita by founding Clown & Sunset. He created the label in order to share music that he felt was too personal to release through any other label.

Clown & Sunset’s first two records were a series of EPs entitled Sunset of a Clown, released in February and October, 2009 respectively. Each EP contained a song from one of the three founding artists. Clown & Sunset’s next EP, Russian Dolls, featured the song “Russian Dolls” by Jaar, and a remix from Detroit DJ and producer Ryan Crosson. In December 2010, Clown & Sunset released Inés, a ten-track compilation. The LP was well received by fans and critics, receiving 7.7 out of 10 rating from Pitchfork. Following Inés, Clown & Sunset began to expand its original roster. As Nikita and Soul searched for musicians to incorporate into the label, Jaar continued the momentum of 2010 releasing his debut album Space is Only Noise to critical acclaim, receiving "Best New Music" from Pitchfork. In June 2011, Valentin Stip, a French, classically trained pianist and electronic musician became the first new artist to debut on Clown & Sunset, releasing an EP, Anytime Will Do, in June, 2011.

In February 2012 Jaar and Kraft premiered Clown & Sunset Aesthetics in New York City with a sold-out Clown & Sunset showcase at the Music Hall of Williamsburg and a 5-hour improvised live exhibit at MoMA PS1.

Artists
Artists who have released music on Clown & Sunset include:

Nicolas Jaar
DARKSIDE
Soul Keita
Nikita Quasim
Valentin Stip
 Acid Pauli

Discography

CS001 – Sunset of a Clown, Vol. 1 (Clown & Sunset · 2009)
CS002 – Sunset of a Clown, Vol. 2 (Clown & Sunset · 2009)
CS003 – Russian Dolls (Clown & Sunset · 2010)
CS004 – Inés LP (Clown & Sunset · 2010)
CS005 – WOUH (Clown & Sunset · 2010)
CS006 – Anytime Will Do EP (Clown & Sunset · 2011)
CS007 – Don't Break My Love EP (Clown & Sunset · 2011)
CS008 – DARKSIDE EP (Clown & Sunset · 2011)
CS009 – MST LP (Clown & Sunset · 2012)

References

Electronic music record labels
American independent record labels